Serguei Smetanine (born 24 October 1973) is a Russian former racing cyclist.

Major results

1996
 1st Stage 2 Vuelta a Castilla y León
 2nd Circuito de Getxo
1997
 1st Overall Clásica de Alcobendas
 1st Stage 2 Setmana Catalana de Ciclisme
 1st Stage 4 Vuelta a Asturias
 1st Stage 4 Vuelta a La Rioja
 3rd Circuito de Getxo
 4th Clásica de Almería
1998
 1st GP Llodio
 1st Stage 3 Vuelta a Aragón
 1st Stage 1 Vuelta a Galicia
 1st Stages 1 & 2 Vuelta a La Rioja
1999
 1st Overall Gran Premio Internacional Mitsubishi MR Cortez
1st Stage 3
 1st Stage 3 Vuelta a Burgos
 1st Stage 1 Vuelta a La Rioja
2000
 1st Stage 5 Volta a Portugal
 1st Stage 5 Settimana Ciclistica Lombarda
 1st Stage 2 Gran Premio Internacional Mitsubishi MR Cortez
2001
 1st Stage 2 Setmana Catalana de Ciclisme
2002
 1st Stage 14 Vuelta a España

Grand Tour general classification results timeline

References

1973 births
Living people
Russian male cyclists